The military reserve forces of France are the military reserve force within the French Armed Forces.

History
From the very moment Napoléon Bonaparte took power as First Consul in the coup of 18 Brumaire, he was feared by his rivals, and keenly supported by the army.  They participated in the creation of a new constitution that forbade a Consul from leading an active army outside France. The violence of the coup d'état had already caused disquiet, and the consuls had access to an impressive garde des consuls.

Following the new constitution to the letter, Napoléon raised a reserve army (and thus not counting as an active army) at Dijon to support his war effort in Italy.  This was the turning point of his Second Italian campaign.

From 1872 to 1999 the French Army reserves were divided into:

 Army Reserve proper
 Territorial Army
 Primary Reserve of the TA

Present organisation
On the suspension of obligatory national service and the professionalisation of its armies, France also modified the organisation of its military reserve in the same professionalising way.  Law n°99-894 of 22 October 1999 (modified by law 2006-449 of 18 April 2006) set out the organisation of the military reserve and of the defence forces.

The military reserve was organised into two bodies :
 the réserve citoyenne (citizen reserve), group of volunteers actively getting to know the military world, undergoing training and maintaining the links between the armed forces and civil society.  Citizen reservists have military status.
 the réserve opérationnelle (operational reserve), grouping together reservists with an ESR (engagement à servir la réserve, or "obligation to serve in the reserve") and former military officers with an availability obligation (who thus remain available for the armed forces).  The reservists serving under an ESR serve as military officers for periods of 1 to 210 days per year; they are coming from all fields (former officers, old appelés du contingent (conscripts), civilians without a military past) and all the professional social categories.

These reservists serve in many branches of the forces - the air force, army, gendarmerie, navy, health service, supply corps, and DGA.

The Reserve of the French Army
The Army operational reserve is about 60% headquarters/staff specialists and 40% sub-unit reservists (company, battery, squadron, drill).

Two types of reserve units are in service:

The Unités d'Intervention de Réserve (UIR) (Intervention Reserve), specializing in national defense
The Unités Spécialisées de Réserve (USR) (Specialist Reserve) for the Engineers, Logistics and NBC units of the Army. These units share the same missions as the active units within the regiment.

Training consists of: 
Reserve Initial Training ("La formation initiale du réserviste", FMIR) : 15 days
Technical Aptitude Certificate ("Le certificat d'aptitude technique élémentaire", CATE) : 15 days
Cadre training (FIE) : 1 month
Reserve Officer Initial Training ("La formation initiale d'officier de réserve", FIOR) : 21 days
Platoon Leader Training ("La formation de chef de section") : 21 days

Among the units expected to form reserve sub-units, circa 2014, were the 1st Infantry Regiment at Sarrebourg; the 35th Infantry Regiment at Belfort; the 92nd Infantry Regiment at Clermont-Ferrand; the 126th Infantry Regiment (Brive); 152nd Infantry Regiment (Colmar); :fr:7e bataillon de chasseurs alpins (7e BCA) at Varces ; 13e BCA at Barby; 16e BC at Bitche; 27e BCA ; Annecy; 1er RTir ; Epinal; 1er RCP at Pamiers; 501e RCC at Mourmelon Le Grand; 1er RCh at Thierville Sur Meuse; 4e RCh ; Gap; 12e RC ; Olivet; 4e RD ; Carnoux En Provence; 1er RHP ; Tarbes; 3e RH at Metz; and the 1st Spahi Regiment (1er RS) at Valence.

References
This page is a translation of :fr:Réserve militaire#La réserve en France.

Anne-Beatrice MICARD, "Paroles de réservistes," Terre information magazine, No. 185, June 2007, pp25-39.

Reserve
Reserve forces